In filmmaking, the rough cut is the second of three stages of offline editing. The term originates from the early days of filmmaking when film stock was physically cut and reassembled, but is still used to describe projects that are recorded and edited digitally.

The rough cut is the first stage in which the film begins to resemble its final product. Rough cuts are recognizable as a conventional film, but may have notable errors or defects, may not have the desired narrative flow from scene to scene, may lack soundtrack music, sound effects or visual effects, and still undergo many significant changes before the release of the film.

Video editing workflow
A number of the preliminary stages can be undertaken by lower cost staff, or people less skilled in using expensive and sophisticated editing equipment (such as those who are not directors). With the advent of digital video editing software and non-linear editing systems (NLE), films or television shows go through a number of stages.

There is often a large amount of footage to be reviewed in a given project. An example workflow is given below:

Digitizing: Ingesting the material into a digital computer allows the footage to be handled much more simply than when it is on its original tape or film form.
Logging: Logging the shot material allows particular shots to be found more easily later
Offline editing: Video effects.
Initial Assembly: The selected shots are moved from the order they are filmed in into the approximate order they will appear in the final cut.
Rough cut: More shot selection, approximate trimming.  The sound is untreated, unfinished, and will require sound editing. Often dialogue and sound effects will be incomplete.  Titles, graphics, special effects, and composites are usually represented only by crude placemarkers.  Colors are untreated, unmatched, and generally unpleasant.
Final cut: The final sequence of images and sound are selected and put in order.
Online editing: The picture and sound quality of the project is adjusted and brought to their optimum levels.
 Mix: Audio is finished by a specialist with equipment in acoustically treated rooms.

Notes

References
Giannetti, Louis. Understanding Movies. Prentice-Hall International, 1999.
Wohl, Michael. Editing Techniques with Final Cut Pro. Peachpit Press, 2002.

Film and video technology
Film editing